Józef Simmler (March 14, 1823, in Warsaw – March 1, 1868, in Warsaw) was a Polish painter known for his classical style and his Polish subjects.

Biography
Simmler came from a wealthy German Protestant family. It was this affluent upbringing that allowed him to pursue his interest in cities like Dresden, Munich and Paris.

Perhaps his most famous work is "Death of Barbara Radziwillowna" ("Śmierć Barbary Radziwiłłówny"), an oil on canvas work completed in 1860. The painting gained immense popularity when the Warsaw-based Society for the Promotion of the Fine Arts, a newly formed institution with the goal of encouraging and promoting domestic art and artists, put it on exhibit in 1861.  It now hangs in the National Museum, Warsaw. His other famous paintings are “Children of King Edward” (1847) and “Portrait of a Nobleman with a Parrot” (1859).

Józef Simmler's major contribution to Polish art is the humaneness that his paintings evoked. He was a specially gifted portraitist. Using styles of costume paintings prevalent in France, he produced works that allowed the public a view of the past. His paintings, however, were more than just reproductions of history. The masterful works also gave a deep sense of compassion, dread, and tenderness.

His daughter's brother-in-law was Eduard Strasburger, the famous Polish-German botanist. One of Simmler's grandsons was Henryk Leon Strasburger, a Polish delegate to the League of Nations.

Selected paintings

References

External links

A gallery of Jozef Simmler works
More works of Josef Simmler.18 pictures

1823 births
1868 deaths
19th-century Polish painters
19th-century Polish male artists
Polish male painters